Patrick Barré (born 12 April 1959 in Houilles, Yvelines) is a former athlete from France who competed mainly in the 100 metres.

He competed for France in the 1980 Summer Olympics held in Moscow, Soviet Union, in the 4 x 100 metre relay, where he won the bronze medal with his team mates Antoine Richard, Pascal Barré (his twin brother) and Hermann Panzo.

References
sports-reference

1959 births
Living people
People from Houilles
French male sprinters
Olympic bronze medalists for France
Athletes (track and field) at the 1980 Summer Olympics
Athletes (track and field) at the 1984 Summer Olympics
Olympic athletes of France
French twins
Twin sportspeople
Medalists at the 1980 Summer Olympics
Olympic bronze medalists in athletics (track and field)
Sportspeople from Yvelines
20th-century French people
21st-century French people